Cherukulam is a village in Malappuram district, Kerala.

Transportation
Cherukulam village connects to other parts of India through Manjeri town. The nearest airport is at Kozhikode.  The nearest major railway station is at Tirur.

References

Villages in Malappuram district
Manjeri